Breed The Pain is the third album by New Zealand metal band 8 Foot Sativa. It was released in New Zealand on 11 January 2005 by Intergalactic Records. It was later released worldwide on 7 March 2005 by Black Mark Records, and in Australia on 18 April 2005 by Roadrunner Records. This album was the only album to feature vocalist Matt Sheppard. Sheppard's girlfriend did the artwork for this album.

Track listing
 "Perpetual Torment" (Gary Smith) – 4:19
 "Breed the Pain" (Smith) – 3:45
 "I Live My Death" (Brent Fox, Smith) – 5:13
 "Mentally Castrated" (Matt Sheppard) – 4:18
 "Altar of Obscenity" (Smith) – 5:00
 "Human Abattoir" (Smith) – 3:53
 "Brutal Revenge" (M. Sheppard) – 5:35
 "The Punishment Within" (M. Sheppard) – 3:59
 "Genetic Treason" (M. Sheppard) – 4:29

Credits
 Matt Sheppard - vocals
 Gary Smith - Guitar
 Brent Fox - Bass guitar
 Sam Sheppard - drums

2005 albums
8 Foot Sativa albums